North Melbourne is an inner-city suburb in Melbourne, Victoria, Australia,  north-west of Melbourne's Central Business District, located within the City of Melbourne local government area. North Melbourne recorded a population of 14,953 at the 2021 census.

North Melbourne is bounded by the CityLink freeway to the west, Victoria Street to the south, O'Connell and Peel Streets to the east and Flemington Road to the north. Since July 2008 its local government area has been the City of Melbourne, when it took over the administration of parts of Kensington and North Melbourne that were previously under the City of Moonee Valley, resulting in an increase of approximately 4760 residents and almost 3000 workers (2006 Census).

Formerly known as Hotham, it was essentially a working class area, with some middle class pockets, and was one of the first towns in Victoria to be granted Municipal status.

Today it continues to undergo gentrification, noted for its Victorian architecture, cosmopolitan demographic, commercial and older industrial areas.

History

North Melbourne's first institutions were built in the 1840s, beginning with a cattle yard. At this time the area was not well defined and included Parkville and Royal Park, as well as a part of West Melbourne.

In the 1850s a Benevolent Asylum was built between Abbotsford and Curzon Streets, coinciding with the desire to find space to accommodate the growing population from the gold rush. (The Asylum remained a feature of the area until its move to Cheltenham in 1911.) In 1859 the area was proclaimed as the municipal Borough of Hotham, after the Governor of Victoria Charles Hotham. Hotham Post Office opened on 20 March 1860.

By 1861, Hotham had a population of over 7,000.

In 1869, some of these decided to form the Hotham Football Club that later became a foundation member of the VFA (Australian rules football), today known as the North Melbourne Kangaroos. On 26 August 1887, the Borough was renamed North Melbourne Town, after the completion of the imposing North Melbourne Town Hall and the Metropolitan Meat Market.

Although there were pockets of middle class housing in the wider tree-lined streets such as Dryburgh, Chapman and Brougham, by the 1880s the suburb had become a predominantly working class area with most of the male population employed in local industry.

In the 1890s tram routes had entered the area as far as Abbotsford Street, walking distance from the Arden Street Oval.

In the 1930s many areas of North Melbourne, in particular the laneways, became overcrowded and defined as slums. As such, large government housing development projects were proposed, which were eventually completed in the 1960s.

The North Melbourne Court of Petty Sessions closed on 1 January 1968 and the former courthouse was sold to a private buyer in 1981.

Commercial centre

The main shopping strip of Errol Street is located around the old North Melbourne Town Hall.

Since the 1990s it has become something of an upmarket strip, home to a number of popular cafes and boutiques.

Demographics

North Melbourne's real estate is above the Melbourne median and the suburb remains an overwhelmingly middle-class community.

It does, however, have a strong migrant mix, having been a popular destination for low income families for decades. More recent arrivals are refugees from countries such as Somalia and Eritrea; they live around the government-owned housing estates near the Melrose Street area, on the suburb's fringe.

Residents of North Melbourne are significantly younger than most other areas; their median age was 28 years, compared to the national median age of 38. Children aged under 15 years made up 10.5% of the population and people aged 65 years and over made up just 7.1% of the population.

Religion
The most common religious affiliation in North Melbourne was "No Religion" and accounted for 46.6% of responses at the 2016 census. Notable churches in North Melbourne include the Curzon Street Church (now known as St Mark the Evangelist), St Mary's Anglican Church and the ornate Ukrainian Catholic Cathedral, built in 1963, on the high section of Dryburgh Street. The Catholic Church and Parish Primary School of St Michaels are also located in North Melbourne.

Housing

Historically, the predominant housing types were old Victorian-style terrace houses, warehouses, and some low-rise apartments.

North Melbourne was slower to gentrify than other inner suburbs, due to established families resisting the sale of their homes for decades. A younger generation finally began to move in the 1980s, capitalising on the proximity to the Melbourne City Centre. Many of the old factories and warehouses were converted into fashionable loft-style apartments in 1990s. Since 2000, there has been a large increase in new medium density apartment complexes being built and house prices now exceed Melbourne's median.

, the median house price was $882,500 at an annual growth of 7.25%. The median price of units was $487,500, having grown at 5.72%.

In the 12-month period to January 2020 North Melbourne reported a median house price of A$1.38 million for a three bedroom house.

Culture

"Spring Fling" is an annual festival for North and West Melbourne.

The heritage listed town hall and former Meat Market are both theatre and arts spaces.

Sport

The North Melbourne Football Club is still active and plays in the national Australian football competition, the Australian Football League. The club's football department and training sessions are based at its traditional home ground at North Melbourne Cricket Ground, which has recently been redeveloped. Since 2019 both AFLW and VFL teams once again play there, bringing football back after a 34-year absence

Transport

Major roads include Flemington Road, Elizabeth Street and Victoria Street.

Despite the naming, the North Melbourne railway station is actually in the adjacent suburb of West Melbourne, while the Flemington Bridge railway station is within North Melbourne boundaries and not in Flemington. Arden railway station is planned to be built on Arden Street within North Melbourne's industrial area, as part of the Melbourne Metro Rail Project.

North Melbourne is serviced by three tram routes:
 57 – West Maribyrnong to Flinders Street station; travels down Flemington Road, and then Abbotsford, Queensberry, Errol, and Victoria Streets.
 58 – West Coburg to Toorak; travels through Royal Park, and then down Flemington Road.
 59 – Airport West to Flinders Street station; travels down Flemington Road.

It also has a number of bus routes.

See also
 City of Essendon – Parts of North Melbourne were previously within this former local government area.
 City of Moonee Valley – Parts of North Melbourne were previously within this local government area.

References

External links

 Shawfactor: History of North Melbourne

Suburbs of Melbourne
Suburbs of the City of Melbourne (LGA)
Slums in Australia